The 1994-95 Four Hills Tournament took place at the four traditional venues of Oberstdorf, Garmisch-Partenkirchen, Innsbruck and Bischofshofen, located in Germany and Austria, between 30 December 1994 and 6 January 1995.

Results

Overall

References

External links 
  

Four Hills Tournament
1994 in ski jumping
1995 in ski jumping
1994 in German sport
1995 in German sport
1995 in Austrian sport
1990s in Innsbruck
December 1994 sports events in Europe
January 1995 sports events in Europe
1994 in Bavaria
1995 in Bavaria